Mahendra Malla was a king of the Malla dynasty and the fourth king of Kantipur. He succeeded his father Amara Malla and ruled from 1560 to 1574.

Reign 
During his reign, Mahendra Malla attempted to develop the economy and trade of his kingdom and thus distributed lands to the people and to different temples. He also built the Taleju Temple situated in Kathmandu.

He issued the first silver mohar coins during his reign and because of this, the coins were called mahendramallis for a long time.

He died in 1574 and was succeeded by his son Sadashiva Malla.

References 

16th-century Nepalese people
Malla rulers of Kantipur
Year of birth unknown

Nepalese monarchs
1574 deaths